"Lady T" can refer to:

Margaret Thatcher, British politician
Teena Marie, American singer
Thalía, Mexican singer
Trijntje Oosterhuis, Dutch singer
Lady T (album), a 1980 album by Teena Marie
"Lady T", a single by Crazy P, from their 2005 album A Night on Earth
the women's sports teams at Dakota State University